Franco Enrique Navarro Monteiro (born 10 November 1961) is a Peruvian football manager and former player who played as a striker. He is the current manager of ADT.

Club career
Navarro played for Independiente from Argentina , Deportivo Municipal, Sporting Cristal, Alianza Lima from Peru and FC Wettingen from Switzerland among others. He retired in 1995.

International career
He was a prolific goal scorer and a participant at the 1982 FIFA World Cup. He was also member of the Peru national football team for the qualification stages of the World Cup in Mexico (1986) and Italy (1990). Navarro played a total of 56 games for Peru between 1980 and 1989, scoring 16 goals. He made his debut on 18 July 1980 in a friendly against Uruguay (0–0) in Montevideo. His last game was on 27 August 1989 against Uruguay at a FIFA World Cup Qualifier.

He is remembered for the leg-breaking incident five minutes into the deciding qualifier game between Argentina and Peru in the 1986 FIFA World Cup in Mexico. The Argentine defender Julián Camino broke Navarro’s leg with a tackle. Camino was not expelled from the game. Argentina with Ricardo Gareca tied the game 2–2 and qualified to the World Cup; Argentina would go on to win the 1986 World Cup.

Coaching career
He has been a coach for several Peruvian teams, including Sporting Cristal, Alianza Lima, and Cienciano as well as the Peru national football team.

References

External links
 
 

1961 births
Living people
Footballers from Lima
Association football forwards
Peruvian footballers
Peru international footballers
Peruvian Primera División players
Deportivo Municipal footballers
Sporting Cristal footballers
Independiente Medellín footballers
Club Atlético Independiente footballers
Tecos F.C. footballers
FC Wettingen players
Unión de Santa Fe footballers
Club Alianza Lima footballers
Categoría Primera A players
Argentine Primera División players
Peruvian expatriate footballers
Peruvian expatriate sportspeople in Colombia
Peruvian expatriate sportspeople in Argentina
Peruvian expatriate sportspeople in Mexico
Expatriate footballers in Colombia
Expatriate footballers in Argentina
Expatriate footballers in Mexico
Expatriate footballers in Switzerland
1982 FIFA World Cup players
1983 Copa América players
1987 Copa América players
1989 Copa América players
Peruvian football managers
Peruvian Primera División managers
Sporting Cristal managers
Club Alianza Lima managers
Sport Boys managers
Peru national football team managers
Club Deportivo Universidad César Vallejo managers
Cienciano managers
Juan Aurich managers
Universidad San Martín managers
FBC Melgar managers
Deportivo Municipal managers
Asociación Deportiva Tarma managers
Universidad Técnica de Cajamarca managers
León de Huánuco managers